Paul Amador is an American politician and a Republican member of the Idaho House of Representatives. First elected in 2016, he represents District 4 (seat B), which includes the city of Coeur d'Alene, Idaho, and a small portion of Kootenai County, Idaho. Paul currently serves as chair of the Ways and Means Committee. Paul is seeking re-election to the Idaho House of Representatives, Seat 4B.

Prior to his three terms in the Idaho House of Representatives, Amador spent most of his career as an administrator at colleges and universities throughout the United States, most recently employed by University of Idaho. Amador currently owns and operates an educational and data management consulting business with his wife.

Education
Amador attended the University of Nevada where he earned a Master of Arts and doctorate in educational leadership. Amador's graduate research focused on both K-12 and higher education-related issues, including public school finance, tuition policy, and educational technology. Amador attended California State University, Fresno, where he earned a Bachelor of Science in agricultural economics.

Idaho House of Representatives

Legislative agenda 
Amador has been actively involved in education-related issue during his service in the Idaho legislature and worked to improve the educational opportunities in Idaho, serving on the House education committee during his first term of office and then as one of a handful of legislators responsible for crafting the K-12 and higher education budgets on the Joint Finance and Appropriations Committee.

Elections

2020
Amador ran unopposed in the Republican Primary and the general election.

2018
Amador defeated Republican challenger Roger Garlock in the May 15, 2018 primary with 68.6% of the vote.

Amador defeated Democratic challenger Shem Hanks in the November 6, 2018 general election with 62.6% of the vote.

2016
Amador defeated Republican incumbent Kathleen Sims in the May 17, 2016 Primary with 51.62% of the vote.

Amador defeated Democratic candidate Tom Hearn in the General Election with 63.31% of the vote.

Personal life
Paul married his wife, Julie, in 2005. They have two sons, Peter and Simon. Paul enjoys traveling, spending time outdoors, and being with his family.

References

External links
Paul Amador at the Idaho Legislature
Campaign website

21st-century American politicians
Living people
Republican Party members of the Idaho House of Representatives
People from Coeur d'Alene, Idaho
Place of birth missing (living people)
Year of birth missing (living people)